The 1960–61 Montenegrin Republic League was 16th season of Montenegrin Republic League. Similar to previous season League was organised as tournament, during the April and May 1961.

Season

Qualifiers 
In the qualifiers, 15 teams were divided into three regional groups. Winners of the groups (OFK Titograd, FK Jedinstvo and Bokelj) qualified for Montenegrin Republic League. Below are the final tables of each qualifying group.

Championship 

At the finals, every team played four games and the winner went to qualifiers for Yugoslav Second League.
Title holder was OFK Titograd, who finished season with all four wins.

Table

Qualifiers for Yugoslav Second League 
In the qualifiers for 1961–62 Second League – East, OFK Titograd was eliminated in Semifinals.

Higher leagues 
On season 1960–61, two Montenegrin teams played in higher leagues of SFR Yugoslavia. Both of them (Budućnost and Sutjeska) participated in 1960–61 Yugoslav Second League.

See also 
 Montenegrin Republic League
 Montenegrin Republic Cup (1947–2006)
 Montenegrin clubs in Yugoslav football competitions (1946–2006)
 Montenegrin Football Championship (1922–1940)

References 

Montenegrin Republic League